The Malta men's national basketball team represents Malta in international basketball. They are controlled by the Malta Basketball Association. Malta has been a FIBA member since 1967, and competes at tournaments such as the European Championship for Small Countries and the Games of the Small States of Europe.

History
Malta made their official debut at the 1985 Games of the Small States of Europe, where they achieved the bronze medal. The team was equally successful at the next edition. Then they did not win another medal again until the 1997 tournament. They surprisingly won the silver medal after defeating Luxembourg in the semifinals, and losing to Cyprus in the final.

In 2001 and 2003, Malta joined the qualifying stages of the EuroBasket for the 2003 and 2005 editions respectively. However, they failed to qualify for both tournaments, as the team finished with six losses in six games played each time.

Malta also participated in all the editions of the European Championship for Small Countries, but did not win any medal until 2010, when they beat Moldova for bronze. In 2012, they won the bronze again and in 2014, Malta lost to Andorra in the final 66–63 to take home silver.

On 1 July 2018, Malta won their first official title after beating Norway, by the score of 75–59 in the final of the 2018 European Championship for Small Countries. Samuel Deguara claimed the MVP title. After this success, Malta decided to take part in the Games of the Small States of Europe in 2019.

Competitive record

At Eurobasket

Team

Current roster
Roster for the 2019 Games of the Small States of Europe:

Head coach position
  Bruno diPietrantonio: 2010
  Paolo Di Fonzo: 2012-2014
  Andrea Paccarie: 2016-present

Kit

Manufacturer
2018: Macron

Sponsor
2018: TEAMSPORT

See also

Sport in Malta
Malta women's national basketball team
 Malta national under-19 basketball team
 Malta national under-17 basketball team
 Malta national 3x3 team

References

External links
Official website 
Malta at FIBA site
Malta National Team - Men at Eurobasket.com

1967 establishments in Malta
Basketball in Malta
Men's national basketball teams
Basketball